John Dowland (c. 1563 – buried 20 February 1626) was an English Renaissance composer, lutenist, and singer. He is best known today for his melancholy songs such as "Come, heavy sleep", "Come again", "Flow my tears", "I saw my Lady weepe", "Now o now I needs must part" and "In darkness let me dwell", but his instrumental music has undergone a major revival, and with the 20th century's early music revival, has been a continuing source of repertoire for lutenists and classical guitarists.

Career and compositions

Very little is known of John Dowland's early life, but it is generally thought he was born in London; some sources even put his birth year as 1563. Irish historian W. H. Grattan Flood claimed that he was born in Dalkey, near Dublin, but no corroborating evidence has ever been found either for that or for Thomas Fuller's claim that he was born in Westminster.  There is a piece of evidence pointing to Dublin as his place of origin: he dedicated the song "From Silent Night" to 'my loving countryman Mr. John Forster the younger, merchant of Dublin in Ireland'. The Forsters were a prominent Dublin family at the time, providing several Lord Mayors to the city.

In 1580 Dowland went to Paris, where he was in service to Sir Henry Cobham, the ambassador to the French court, and his successor Sir Edward Stafford. He became a Roman Catholic at this time. Around 1584, Dowland moved back to England and married. In 1588 he was admitted Mus. Bac. from Christ Church, Oxford. In 1594 a vacancy for a lutenist came up at the English court, but Dowland's application was unsuccessful – he claimed his religion led to his not being offered a post at Elizabeth I's Protestant court. However, his conversion was not publicised, and being Catholic did not prevent some other important musicians (such as William Byrd) from a court career.

From 1598 Dowland worked at the court of Christian IV of Denmark, though he continued to publish in London. King Christian was very interested in music and paid Dowland astronomical sums; his salary was 500 daler a year, making him one of the highest-paid servants of the Danish court. Though Dowland was highly regarded by King Christian, he was not the ideal servant, often overstaying his leave when he went to England on publishing business or for other reasons. Dowland was dismissed in 1606 and returned to England; in early 1612 he secured a post as one of James I's lutenists. There are few compositions dating from the moment of his royal appointment until his death in London in 1626.  While the date of his death is not known, "Dowland's last payment from the court was on 20 January 1626, and he was buried at St Ann's, Blackfriars, London, on 20 February 1626."

Two major influences on Dowland's music were the popular consort songs, and the dance music of the day. Most of Dowland's music is for his own instrument, the lute. It includes several books of solo lute works, lute songs (for one voice and lute), part-songs with lute accompaniment, and several pieces for viol consort with lute. The poet Richard Barnfield wrote that Dowland's "heavenly touch upon the lute doth ravish human sense."

One of his better known works is the lute song "Flow my tears", the first verse of which runs:

He later wrote what is probably his best known instrumental work, Lachrimae, or Seaven Teares, Figured in Seaven Passionate Pavans, a set of seven pavanes for five viols and lute, each based on the theme derived from the lute song "Flow my tears". It became one of the best known collections of consort music in his time. His pavane, "Lachrymae antiquae", was also popular in the seventeenth century, and was arranged and used as a theme for variations by many composers. He wrote a lute version of the popular ballad "My Lord Willoughby's Welcome Home".

Dowland's music often displays the melancholia that was so fashionable in music at that time. He wrote a consort piece with the punning title "Semper Dowland, semper dolens" (always Dowland, always doleful), which may be said to sum up much of his work.

Richard Barnfield, Dowland's contemporary, refers to him in poem VIII of The Passionate Pilgrim (1598), a Shakespearean sonnet:

Published works
Only one comprehensive monograph of Dowland's life and works, by Diana Poulton, is available in print. The fullest catalog list of Dowland's works is that compiled by K. Dawn Grapes in John Dowland: A Research and Information Guide (Routledge, 2019). The numbering for the lute pieces follow the same system as Diana Poulton created in her The Collected Lute Music of John Dowland. P numbers are therefore sometimes used to designate individual pieces.

Whole Book of Psalms (1592) 
Published by Thomas Est in 1592, The Whole Booke of Psalmes contained works by 10 composers, including 6 pieces by Dowland.
 Put me not to rebuke, O Lord (Psalm 38)
 All people that on earth do dwell (Psalm 100)
 My soul praise the Lord (Psalm 104)
 Lord to thee I make my moan (Psalm 130)
 Behold and have regard (Psalm 134)
 A Prayer for the Queens most excellent Maiestie

New Book of Tablature (1596) 
The New Booke of Tabliture was published by William Barley in 1596. It contains seven solo lute pieces by Dowland.

Lamentatio Henrici Noel (1596) 
Perhaps written for the professional choir of Westminster Abbey.
 The Lamentation of a sinner
 Domine ne in furore (Psalm 6)
 Miserere mei Deus (Psalm 51)
 The humble sute of a sinner
 The humble complaint of a sinner
 De profundis (Psalm 130)
 Domine exaudi (Psalm 143)

Of uncertain attribution are:
 Ye righteous in the Lord
 An heart that's broken
 I shame at my unworthiness

First Book of Songs (1597) 

Dowland in London in 1597 published his First Booke of Songes or Ayres, a set of 21 lute-songs and one of the most influential collections in the history of the lute. Brian Robins wrote that "many of the songs were composed long before the publication date, [...] However, far from being immature, the songs of Book I reveal Dowland as a fully fledged master." It is set out in a way that allows performance by a soloist with lute accompaniment or by various other combinations of singers and instrumentalists. The lute-songs are listed below. After them, at the end of the collection, comes "My Lord Chamberlaine, His Galliard", a piece for two people to play on one lute.

Second Book of Songs (1600) 

Dowland published his Second Booke of Songs or Ayres in 1600. It has 22 lute songs. There is also an instrumental work, Dowland’s adew for Master Oliver Cromwell. The songs are as follows:

Third Book of Songs (1603) 
The Third and Last Booke of Songs or Aires was published in 1603.

The 21 songs are:

Lachrimae (1604) 
The Lachrimae, or Seaven Teares was published in 1604. It contains the seven pavans of Lachrimae itself and 14 others, including the famous Semper Dowland semper Dolens.
 Lachrimae Antiquae
 Lachrimae Antiquae Nouae
 Lachrimae Gementes
 Lachrimae Tristes
 Lachrimae Coactae
 Lachrimae Amantis
 Lachrimae Verae
 Semper Dowland semper Dolens (P.9)
 Sir Henry Vmptons Funeral
 M. Iohn Langtons Pauan
 The King of Denmarks Galiard (P.40)
 The Earle of Essex Galiard
 Sir Iohn Souch his Galiard
 M. Henry Noell his Galiard
 M. Giles Hoby his Galiard
 M. Nicho. Gryffith his Galiard
 M. Thomas Collier his Galiard with two trebles
 Captaine Piper his Galiard (P.19)
 M. Bucton his Galiard
 Mrs Nichols Almand
 M. George Whitehead his Almand

Micrologus (1609) 
Dowland published a translation of the Micrologus of Andreas Ornithoparcus in 1609, originally printed in Latin in Leipzig in 1517.

Varietie of Lute-Lessons (1610)
This was published by Dowland's son Robert in 1610 and contains solo lute works by his father and others.

A Musicall Banquet (1610)
This was likewise published by Dowland's son that year. It contains three songs by his father: 
 Farre from Triumphing Court
 Lady If You So Spight Me
 In Darknesse Let Me Dwell

A Pilgrimes Solace (1612) 
Dowland's last work A Pilgrimes Solace, was published in 1612, and seems to have been conceived more as a collection of contrapuntal music than as solo works. Edmund Fellowes praised it as the last masterpiece in the English school of lutenist song before John Attey's First Booke of Ayres of Foure Parts, with Tableture for the Lute (1622). John Palmer also wrote, "Although this book produced no hits, it is arguably Dowland's best set, evincing his absorption of the style of the Italian monodists."

Unpublished works 
Many of Dowland's works survive only in manuscript form.

Suspicions of treason
Dowland performed a number of espionage assignments for Sir Robert Cecil in France and Denmark; despite his high rate of pay, Dowland seems to have been only a court musician. However, we have in his own words the fact that he was for a time embroiled in treasonous Catholic intrigue in Italy, whither he had travelled in the hopes of meeting and studying with Luca Marenzio, a famed madrigal composer. Whatever his religion, however, he was still intensely loyal to the Queen, though he seems to have had something of a grudge against her for her remark that he, Dowland, "was a man to serve any prince in the world, but [he] was an obstinate Papist." But in spite of this, and though the plotters offered him a large sum of money from the Pope, as well as safe passage for his wife and children to come to him from England, in the end he declined to have anything further to do with their plans and begged pardon from Sir Robert Cecil and from the Queen.

Private life
John Dowland was married and had children, as referenced in his letter to Sir Robert Cecil. However, he had long periods of separation from his family, as his wife stayed in England while he worked on the Continent.

His son Robert Dowland (c. 1591 – 1641) was also a musician, working for some time in the service of the first Earl of Devonshire, and taking over his father's position of lutenist at court when John died.

Dowland's melancholic lyrics and music have often been described as his attempts to develop an "artistic persona" in spite of actually being a cheerful person, but many of his own personal complaints, and the tone of bitterness in many of his comments, suggest that much of his music and his melancholy truly did come from his own personality and frustration.

Modern interpretations
One of the first 20th-century musicians who successfully helped reclaim Dowland from the history books was the singer-songwriter Frederick Keel. Keel included fifteen Dowland pieces in his two sets of Elizabethan love songs published in 1909 and 1913, which achieved popularity in their day. These free arrangements for piano and low or high voice were intended to fit the tastes and musical practices associated with art songs of the time.

In 1935, Australian-born composer Percy Grainger, who also had a deep interest in music made before Bach, arranged Dowland's Now, O now I needs must part for piano. Some years later, in 1953, Grainger wrote a work titled Bell Piece (Ramble on John Dowland's 'Now, O now I needs must part'), which was a version scored for voice and wind band, based on his previously mentioned transcription.

In 1951 the counter-tenor Alfred Deller recorded songs by Dowland, Thomas Campion, and Philip Rosseter with the label HMV (His Master's Voice) HMV C.4178 and another HMV C.4236 of Dowland's "Flow my Tears". In 1977, Harmonia Mundi also published two records of Deller singing Dowland's Lute songs (HM 244&245-H244/246).

Dowland's song "Come Heavy Sleepe, the Image of True Death" was the inspiration for Benjamin Britten's Nocturnal after John Dowland, written in 1963 for the guitarist Julian Bream. It consists of eight variations, all based on musical themes drawn from the song or its lute accompaniment, finally resolving into a guitar setting of the song itself.

Dowland's music became part of the repertoire of the early music revival with Bream and tenor Peter Pears, and later with Christopher Hogwood and David Munrow and the Early Music Consort in the late 1960s and later with the Academy of Ancient Music from the early 1970s.

Jan Akkerman, guitarist of the Dutch progressive rock band Focus, recorded "Tabernakel" in 1973 (though released in 1974), an album of John Dowland songs and some original material, performed on lute.

The complete works of John Dowland were recorded by the Consort of Musicke, and released on the L'Oiseau Lyre label, though they recorded some of the songs as vocal consort music; the Third Book of Songs and A Pilgrim's Solace have yet to be recorded in their entirety as collections of solo songs.

The 1999 ECM New Series recording In Darkness Let Me Dwell features new interpretations of Dowland songs performed by tenor John Potter, lutenist Stephen Stubbs, and baroque violinist Maya Homburger in collaboration with English jazz musicians John Surman and Barry Guy.

Nigel North recorded Dowland's complete works for solo lute on four CDs between 2004 and 2007, on Naxos records.

Paul O'Dette recorded the complete lute works for Harmonia Mundi on five CDs issued from 1995 to 1997.

Elvis Costello included a recording (with Fretwork and the Composers Ensemble) of Dowland's "Can she excuse my wrongs" as a bonus track on the 2006 re-release of his The Juliet Letters.

In October 2006, Sting, who says he has been fascinated by the music of John Dowland for 25 years, released an album featuring Dowland's songs titled Songs from the Labyrinth, on Deutsche Grammophon, in collaboration with Edin Karamazov on lute and archlute. They described their treatment of Dowland's work in a Great Performances appearance. To give some idea of the tone and intrigues of life in late Elizabethan England, Sting also recites throughout the album portions of a 1593 letter written by Dowland to Sir Robert Cecil. The letter describes Dowland's travels to various points of Western Europe, then breaks into a detailed account of his activities in Italy, along with a heartfelt denial of the charges of treason whispered against him by unknown persons. Dowland most likely was suspected of this for travelling to the courts of various Catholic monarchs and accepting payment from them greater than what a musician of the time would normally have received for performing.

Science fiction writer Philip K. Dick referred to Dowland in many of his works, including the novel Flow My Tears, the Policeman Said (1974), even using the pseudonym "Jack Dowland" once.

Scores

The Collected Lute Music of John Dowland, with lute tablature and keyboard notation, was transcribed and edited by Diana Poulton and Basil Lam, Faber Music Limited, London 1974.

Notes

References

Bibliography

 2004/2009. (facsimile and commentary; with three unique works by Dowland)

.  Also published by University of California Press,

External links

Generic information 
"John Dowland" – Oxford Bibliographies (biography and annotated source suggestions)
The work of John Dowland – list of publications and works. (Partially in German) 

 
 
 

Music Collection in Cambridge Digital Library, which contains many early copies/examples of Dowland's compositions

Video and audio resources 
Some video performances of John Dowland's songs by Valeria Mignaco, soprano & Alfonso Marin, lute
Four Pieces by John Dowland performed by lutenist Brian Wright
Another Lute Website Overview of video's of solo work and songs of John Dowland.
Lachrimae or Seaven Teares – 1604 by Hespèrion XX dir. Jordi Savall

1563 births
1626 deaths
16th-century classical composers
16th-century English composers
16th-century Roman Catholics
17th-century classical composers
17th-century English composers
17th-century Roman Catholics
Renaissance composers
Composers for lute
English Baroque composers
English classical composers
English madrigal composers
English male classical composers
English lutenists
English singers
English expatriates in France
English expatriates in Denmark
English Roman Catholics
Converts to Roman Catholicism
Alumni of Christ Church, Oxford
17th-century male musicians